Then Came Bronson is an American adventure/drama television series starring Michael Parks that aired on NBC. It was created by Denne Bart Petitclerc, and produced by MGM Television. Then Came Bronson began with a television film pilot that aired on NBC on March 24, 1969; the pilot was also released in Europe as a theatrical feature film. This was followed by a single season of 26 episodes airing between September 17, 1969, and April 1, 1970.

Overview 
The series features Parks as the protagonist, James "Jim" Bronson, a newspaperman who becomes disillusioned after the suicide of his best friend Nick (Martin Sheen), and with "working for The Man" after a heated argument with his editor.

In order to renew his soul, Bronson becomes a vagabond searching for the meaning of life and seeking experiences that life has to offer (as revealed in the series pilot). During his travels, he shares his values with the people he meets along the way and to whom he lends a helping hand when possible. Bronson rides a Harley-Davidson Sportster motorcycle and, as such, he was viewed by some as a modern version of the solitary cowboy wandering the American west. The motorcycle had previously been sold to Nick by Bronson. After it is left at the scene of the suicide by his friend, Bronson buys it back from the widow.

Though the opening promises a journey of self-discovery, the premise of each episode is that Bronson enters someone else's life at a crucial point and acts as a catalyst for change. When Bronson encounters an Amish community, for example, a local boy becomes enraptured by the outside world and steals Bronson's motorcycle to run off to Reno, Nevada. In another episode, located in Reno, Nevada, Bronson meets his cousin Eve on her wedding day and lends her money for the wedding service, but she runs off to the casinos and gambles it away.

The first three episodes, including the end credits scenes, were shot in and around Jackson, Wyoming. The pilot film was also shown at the town's (then) only theater to give the locals a sense of what the series was going to be about, since they were shooting in town and at popular local area locations.

Bronson is committed to pacifism and often redirects an antagonist's anger into self-examination. Always, like a true catalyst, Bronson rolls out of every episode unchanged.

The show had obvious similarities to the early 1960s series Route 66; Michael Parks guest-starred in one episode of that series. It was also sometimes erroneously described as a knock-off of Easy Rider.

Series opening 
The opening of the show served as a metaphor for the premise of the show: getting away from the "big city" and leading a simpler life. The opening begins with Bronson riding up to a red light in San Francisco and he briefly chats with a commuter. The scene also introduces Bronson's signature-phrase, which he often used in the episodes, "Hang in there".

Driver: "Taking a trip?"
Bronson: "What's that?"
Driver: "Taking a trip?"
Bronson: "Yeah."
Driver: "Where to?"
Bronson: "Oh, I don't know. Wherever I end up, I guess."
Driver: "Man, I wish I was you."
Bronson: "Really?"
Driver: "Yeah."
Bronson: "Well, hang in there."

From here he heads out to California's State Route 1 and then crosses over the Bixby Creek Bridge.

Cast 
Michael Parks, who starred as James Bronson, had acted on television and starred in three anti-establishment films, Wild Seed, The Happening, and Bus Riley's Back in Town. He went on to have a steady career in drive-in horror movies and TV shows. Also a talented singer, Parks recorded three pop/jazz albums: Long Lonesome Highway, Closing the Gap, Blue, and several gospel albums. Long Lonesome Highway and Closing the Gap were connected with particular strength to Then Came Bronson. Parks performed the former's title selection over the closing credits of each episode, and it and the latter both featured other music from the series. (See below.)

Guest stars 
Actors James Doohan ("Scotty") and Meg Wyllie, who appeared in guest roles, had previously worked on the original Star Trek series.

Production 
The series was filmed and broadcast in color.

The motorcycle 
Bronson's motorcycle, a 1969 XLH 900cc Harley-Davidson Sportster, figures in many episodes. In one episode he enters several motorcycle races; in another, he makes an emergency run to fetch a doctor, but in some stories, the motorcycle serves merely as his transportation.

The fuel tank is illustrated with the Eye of Providence.

Crew 
Several of Bronsons production staff and cast members had previously worked on the original Star Trek series, including executive producer Herbert F. Solow and producer Robert H. Justman, and writers D. C. Fontana and Robert Sabaroff.

The series is also notable for providing the first television script credit for writer-producer Susan Harris, who went on to create Soap and The Golden Girls.

Music 
The opening instrumental theme song was titled "Then Came Bronson" and was composed and conducted by George Duning. The closing vocal theme for the series, titled "Long Lonesome Highway", was sung by Parks and written and composed by James Hendricks; it was a Billboard Magazine Hot 100 hit that reached #20 in 1970.

On March 25, 1970, Parks guest-starred on "The Johnny Cash Show" S1E25. Cash riding Bronson's Harley-Davidson introduces Parks as Bronson, saying, "And then Bronson came back to Tennessee". Parks sang his hit song from the show and then he and Johnny did a duet of Woody Guthrie's "Oklahoma Hills".

Parks released two albums on the MGM label that featured music from this series, Closing the Gap (1969), and Long Lonesome Highway (1970). In addition, other artists such as John Bahler, Kiel Martin,  Gary Jayson, Buffy Sainte-Marie, and Tom Paxton sang songs that appeared in the series. Actress Bonnie Bedelia in the pilot sang gospel song "Wayfaring Stranger" with Parks.

A version of "San Antonio Rose", sung by Parks, appears on the Rhino CD Golden Throats 3: Sweethearts of Rodeo Drive.

In 2010, Duning's score for the pilot and two episode scores by Gil Mellé were released as part of Film Score Monthly's TV Omnibus: Volume One (1962–1976). In 2013 Intrada Records released a two-disc set of music from the series, featuring Duning's six episode scores on disc one and selections from the other scores on disc two by John Parker, Elliot Kaplan, Stu Phillips, Dean Elliott, Richard Shores, Tom McIntosh, and Philip Springer.

Episodes

Home media 
The pilot telefilm was made available on DVD as a part of the Warner Archives collection from Warner Bros. on November 17, 2009.

Awards 
 Episode #10, "Two Percent of Nothing" (guest-starring Steve Ihnat and Pat Quinn) written by D. C. Fontana], was nominated for the Writers Guild Award.

Other media 
Three  tie-in novels with original stories were published during the show's run: Then Came Bronson by William Johnston, and Then Came Bronson #2: The Ticket and Then Came Bronson #3: Rock! by Chris Stratton.

MPC released a model kit "Bronson Motorcycle Custom Harley-Davidson Sportster" in 1970 in 1/8 Scale.

In popular culture 
The series was parodied by Pat Paulsen in a running sketch, "Then Came Paulsen", on Pat Paulsen's Half a Comedy Hour. Paulsen's motorcycle had training wheels.

The series was also satirized by Mad magazine in a piece titled "Then Came Bombsome", which portrayed Parks smoking atop his Harley in the iconic opening scene at the San Francisco stoplight:  "Takin' a trip"?  "No, this is a regular cigarette I'm smoking."

Then Came Bronson has also been referenced numerous times on the film-mocking TV series Mystery Science Theater 3000, usually in a scene featuring a lone figure riding on a motorcycle. MST3K writer Frank Conniff, who portrayed TV's Frank, is said to be a big fan of the short-lived series.

References

External links 
 
 
 
 Then Came Bronson television series opening scene at YouTube
 Then Came Bronson at Super70s.com
 TCB Multimedia Site

1969 American television series debuts
1970 American television series endings
1960s American drama television series
1970s American drama television series
English-language television shows
Motorcycle television series
NBC original programming
Television series by MGM Television